Martin Johnson may refer to:

Martin Johnson (rugby union) (born 1970), English rugby union footballer and manager
One half of Martin and Osa Johnson (1884–1937), a husband-and-wife adventurer/explorer/filmmaker team from Kansas
Martin Johnson (musician) (born 1985), lead singer of Boys Like Girls
Martin Johnson (racing driver) (born 1963), British auto racing driver
Martin Hume Johnson (born 1944), Emeritus Professor of Reproductive Sciences at the University of Cambridge.
Martin Michael Johnson (1899–1975), Roman Catholic Bishop of Nelson, British Columbia, then Archbishop of Vancouver 1964–1969
Martin N. Johnson (1850–1909), U.S. Senator from North Dakota
Martin W. Johnson (1893–1984), U.S. oceanographer
Marty P. Johnson, CEO of Isles, Inc. in Trenton, NJ
Martin Johnson (Hollyoaks), a fictional character from British soap opera Hollyoaks
Martin Johnson (MP), Member of Parliament for Woodstock
Martin Johnson (writer), English writer on cricket and other sports
Martin Johnson (footballer) (1906–1977), English footballer

See also
Martin Johnston (1947–1990), Australian poet and novelist
Marty Johnstone (1951–1979), drug dealer